Lincoln University or University of Lincoln may refer to:

United States

California 
Abraham Lincoln University, a law school in Los Angeles
Claremont Lincoln University, an accredited online graduate university in Claremont
Lincoln University (California), a private university in Oakland

Illinois 

Lincoln Christian University, a university based in Lincoln
Lincoln College (Illinois), a private, independent liberal arts college located in Lincoln

Other states 
Juarez–Lincoln University, a former university (1971–1991) based in Fort Worth and Austin, Texas
Lincoln Memorial University, a private liberal arts college in Harrogate, Tennessee
Lincoln University (Missouri), a public historically black public university in Jefferson City, Missouri
Lincoln University (Pennsylvania), a public historically black university in Chester County, Pennsylvania
Lincoln University (CDP), Pennsylvania, a census-designated place in Lower Oxford Township, Chester County
University of Nebraska–Lincoln, a public research university in Lincoln, Nebraska

Other countries
Lincoln College (University of Adelaide), a religious residential college in North Adelaide, South Australia
Lincoln University College, Malaysia, a private university in Petaling Jaya, Selangor
Lincoln University (New Zealand), a public university in Lincoln, Canterbury Region, South Island
University of Lincoln, a public research university in Lincoln, England

See also
Lincoln Law School (disambiguation)
Lincoln College (disambiguation)
Lincoln School (disambiguation)
Lincoln Institute (disambiguation)
Morrill Land-Grant Colleges Act; schools created this way are sometimes called Lincoln Universities, since Lincoln signed the first Morrill Act